Mods and rockers were two conflicting British youth subcultures of the 1950s and 1960s. Media coverage of mods and rockers fighting in 1964 sparked a moral panic about British youth, and the two groups became widely perceived as violent, unruly troublemakers.

The rocker subculture was centred on motorcycling. Rockers generally wore protective clothing such as black leather jackets and motorcycle boots or brothel creeper. The style was influenced by Marlon Brando in the 1953 film The Wild One. The common rocker hairstyle was a pompadour, while their music genre of choice was 1950s rock and roll and R&B, played by artists including Eddie Cochran, Gene Vincent, and Bo Diddley, as well as British rock and roll musicians such as Billy Fury and Johnny Kidd.

The mod subculture was centred on fashion and music, and many mods rode scooters.  Mods wore suits and other cleancut outfits, and listened to music genres such as modern jazz, soul, Motown, ska  and British blues-rooted bands like the Yardbirds, the Small Faces, and the Who. The Who wrote a portrait of the cultures with their 1973 album Quadrophenia.

Physical conflicts 
BBC News stories from May 1964 stated that mods and rockers were jailed after riots in seaside resort towns in Southern England, such as Margate in Kent, Brighton in Sussex, and Clacton in Essex.

Conflicts took place at Clacton and Hastings during the Easter weekend of 1964. A second round took place on the south coast of England over the Whitsun weekend (18 and 19 May 1964), especially at Brighton, where fights occurred over two days and moved along the coast to Hastings and back; hence the "Second Battle of Hastings" tag. A small number of rockers were isolated on Brighton beach where they – despite being protected by police – were overwhelmed and assaulted by mods. Eventually calm was restored and a judge levied heavy fines, describing those arrested as "sawdust Caesars."

Newspapers described the mod and rocker clashes as being of "disastrous proportions", and labelled mods and rockers as "vermin" and "louts". Newspaper editorials fanned the flames of hysteria, such as a Birmingham Post editorial in May 1964, which warned that mods and rockers were "internal enemies" in the UK who would "bring about disintegration of a nation's character". The magazine Police Review argued that the mods and rockers' purported lack of respect for law and order could cause violence to "surge and flame like a forest fire".

As a result of this media coverage, two British Members of Parliament travelled to the seaside areas to survey the damage, and MP Harold Gurden called for a resolution for intensified measures to control hooliganism.  One of the prosecutors in the trial of some of the Clacton brawlers argued that mods and rockers were youths with no serious views, who lacked respect for law and order.

There were occasional incidents thereafter. The punk band The Exploited recorded the song "Fuck the Mods" on the B-side of their first release and the record's back cover stated "To all the Edinburgh punks and skins – keep on mod-bashing!!"  The band performed in Finsbury Park, London in 1981 on the same night that The Jam were playing nearby, and there was fighting after the gigs between the mods who had watched The Jam and the rockers who had watched The Exploited.

Academic debunking 
The sociologist Stanley Cohen was led by his retrospective study of the mods and rockers conflict to develop the term "moral panic". In his 1972 study Folk Devils and Moral Panics, he examined media coverage of the mod and rocker riots in the 1960s. He concedes that mods and rockers had some fights in the mid-1960s, but argues that they were no different from the evening brawls that occurred between youths throughout the 1950s and early 1960s at seaside resorts and after football games. He argues that the UK media turned the mod subculture into a symbol of delinquent and deviant status.

Cohen argues that as media hysteria about knife-wielding mods increased, the image of a fur-collared anorak and scooter would "stimulate hostile and punitive reactions". He says the media used possibly faked interviews with supposed rockers such as "Mick the Wild One". The media also tried to exploit accidents that were unrelated to mod-rocker violence, such as an accidental drowning of a youth, which resulted in the headline "Mod Dead in Sea".

Eventually, when the media ran out of real fights to report, they would publish deceptive headlines, such as using a subheading "Violence", even when the article reported that there was no violence at all. Newspaper writers also began to associate mods and rockers with various social issues, such as teen pregnancy, contraceptives, amphetamines, and violence.

Media 
The 2010 remake of the 1948 film Brighton Rock is set in the era of mods and rockers, with Bank Holiday tribal clashes on Brighton promenades and beaches.

The 1979 film Quadrophenia starring Phil Daniels and Leslie Ash is also set against the background of the 1964 Brighton clash with the incident featuring prominently.

See also 

Mods & Rockers Film Festival
Mod revival

Footnotes

External links 

 Rocker Reunion website
 The Mods and Rockers
 Mods – 1960s Fun Lovin' Criminals
 Rockers

Youth culture in the United Kingdom
Social history of the United Kingdom
Motorcycling subculture in the United Kingdom
History of fashion
Working-class culture in the United Kingdom
Moral panic